The Tifton, Thomasville and Gulf Railway was chartered on June 26, 1897, and operated from Tifton, GA to Thomasville, GA in 1900. The TT&G was consolidated with the Atlantic and Birmingham Railroad and the Tifton and Northeastern Railroad on December 3, 1903, to form the Atlantic and Birmingham Railway. It then became part of the Atlanta, Birmingham and Atlantic Railroad when it took over the A&B on April 12, 1906.

References

External links
Georgia Northern Railway Co. v. Tifton, Thomasville & Gulf Railway Co., 109 Ga. 762 (1900) (Case Law Access Project)

Defunct Georgia (U.S. state) railroads
Predecessors of the Atlantic Coast Line Railroad
Railway companies established in 1897
Railway companies disestablished in 1903